The Find is the first full-length album by hip hop artist Ohmega Watts. It was released in 2005 on Ubiquity Records.

Track listing
"Introducing"
"Where It All Started" feat. DJ DNA
"That Sound" feat. Lightheaded, The Procussions, & Noell
"You Are Now Tuned In" feat. Adam L & DJ Bombay
"Journey (Interlude 1)"
"Full Swing" feat. Neogen & Deacon
"A Request"
"Mind Power"
"Your Love"  feat. Tiffany Simpson
"Treasure Hunt" feat. Sugar Candy
"Groovin' on Sunshine"
"At the Oasis (Interlude 2)"
"The Find" feat. Stro The 89th Key (of The Procussions)
"Saturday Night Live (Perfect Strangers No. 1)" feat. Surreal & Sharlok Poems
"The Harder They Come (Interlude 3)"
"The Treatment" feat. Manchild, Braille, & Big Rec
"Stay Tuned" feat. Sojourn
"Ya'll There? (Interlude 4)"
"Floor Rock"
"Move!"
"Long Ago" feat. Othello
"Dream On (Outro)"

References

2005 debut albums
Ubiquity Records albums
Ohmega Watts albums